Robert Douglas Christie (7 March 1942 – 8 February 2012) was an English first-class cricketer.

Christie was born in British India at New Delhi. He was educated in England at Eton College, before going up to New College, Oxford. While studying at Oxford, he played first-class cricket for Oxford University in 1964, making four appearances. He scored 47 runs in his four matches, with a high score of 21. With his right-arm medium pace bowling, he took 8 wickets with best figures of 4 for 44. After graduating from Oxford, Christie worked in the financial industry. He died suddenly while on holiday in Costa Rica in February 2012.

References

External links

1942 births
2012 deaths
People from New Delhi
People educated at Eton College
Alumni of New College, Oxford
English cricketers
Oxford University cricketers
English bankers
20th-century English businesspeople